Clay LaVergne Shaw (March 17, 1913 – August 15, 1974) was an American businessman, military officer, and part-time contact of the Domestic Contact Service (DCS) of the CIA. Shaw is best known for being the only person brought to trial for involvement in the assassination of John F. Kennedy. Shaw was acquitted in 1969 after less than one hour of jury deliberation, but some conspiracy theorists continue to speculate on his possible involvement.

Background 

Shaw, a native of Kentwood, Louisiana, was the son of Glaris Lenora Shaw, a United States Marshal, and Alice Shaw. His grandfather had been the sheriff of Tangipahoa Parish. When Shaw was five, his family moved to New Orleans, where he eventually attended Warren Easton High School.

After graduating high school in 1928, Shaw was hired by Western Union as manager of a local office in New Orleans.  In 1935, Western Union transferred him to New York City where he became a district manager. While in New York, Shaw, who wanted to pursue a career as a writer, attended Columbia University.  He later left Western Union to pursue a career in public relations, eventually accepting a position with the Keedick Lecture Bureau.

Shaw enlisted in the United States Army at the start of World War II and was assigned to the Medical Corps as a private.  He later received an officer's commission and was posted to England where he served briefly in a hospital unit.  He was transferred to the Quartermaster Corps and served as secretary to the General Staff in England and after the Normandy invasion served in France and Belgium.  He was decorated by three nations: the United States with the Legion of Merit and Bronze Star, by France with the Croix de Guerre and named Chevalier de l'Ordre du Merite, and by Belgium named Knight of the Order of the Crown of Belgium. Shaw was honorably discharged from the United States Army as a major in 1946.

After World War II, Shaw helped start the International Trade Mart in New Orleans, which facilitated the sales of both domestic and imported goods. He was known locally for his efforts to preserve buildings in New Orleans' historic French Quarter.

Shaw was also a published playwright. The best-known of his works, Submerged (1929), was co-written with H. Stuart Cottman when both were still high-school students.

Arrest and trial

New Orleans District Attorney Jim Garrison prosecuted Shaw on the charge that he and a group of activists, including David Ferrie and Guy Banister, were involved in a conspiracy with elements of the CIA in the John F. Kennedy assassination. Garrison had Shaw arrested on March 1, 1967. By then Banister and Ferrie were both deceased, but Garrison believed that Shaw was the man named as "Clay Bertrand" in the Warren Commission Report. Garrison said that Shaw used the alias of Clay Bertrand in New Orleans' gay society.

During the trial, which took place in January and February 1969, Garrison called insurance salesman Perry Russo as his main witness. Russo testified that he had attended a party at the apartment of anti-Castro activist David Ferrie. At the party, Russo said that Lee Harvey Oswald (who Russo said was introduced to him as "Leon Oswald"), Ferrie, and "Clem Bertrand" (who Russo identified in the courtroom as Shaw) had discussed assassinating Kennedy. The conversation included plans for the "triangulation of crossfire" and alibis for the participants.

Critics of Garrison argue that his own records indicate that Russo's story had evolved over time. A key source was the "Sciambra Memo", which recorded Assistant D.A. Andrew Sciambra's first interview with Russo. The memo does not mention an "assassination party" and states that Russo met with Shaw on two occasions, neither of which occurred at the party.

On March 1, 1969, Shaw was acquitted less than an hour after the case went to the jury.

Shaw denied any part of a conspiracy and said of the slain President: "I was a great admirer of Kennedy. I thought he had given the nation a new turn after the rather drab Eisenhower years ... I felt he was vitally concerned about social issues, which concerned me also. I thought he had youth, imagination, style, and élan. All in all, I considered him a splendid president."

Death
A heavy cigarette smoker for most of his life, Shaw died at the age of 61 at his home on August 15, 1974. The cause of death was listed as metastatic lung cancer. He was buried in Woodland Cemetery in Kentwood, Louisiana.

At the time of his death, Shaw was engaged in a $5 million lawsuit against Garrison and members of an organization, Truth and Consequences Inc., that had financed Garrison's investigation. As Shaw, a lifelong bachelor, had no heirs or surviving relatives, the United States Supreme Court dismissed the suit in 1978.

Later disclosures
In 1979, Richard Helms, former Director of the CIA, testified under oath that Shaw had been a part-time contact of the Domestic Contact Service (DCS) of the CIA, where Shaw volunteered information from his travels abroad, mostly to Latin America. Like Shaw, 150,000 Americans (businessmen, and journalists, etc.) had provided such information to the DCS by the mid-1970s "on a nonclandestine basis", and that "such acts of cooperation should not be confused with an actual Agency relationship".

In popular culture
Tommy Lee Jones portrayed Shaw in Oliver Stone's 1991 film JFK. He was nominated for the Academy Award for Best Supporting Actor for the role.

References

Further reading

External links
Jim Garrison and New Orleans
Louisiana v. Shaw (1969) trial transcript
Orleans Parish Grand Jury transcripts
Esquire December 1968 interview with Clay Shaw, James Kirkwood
Penthouse interview with Clay Shaw
Jim Garrison Interview, Playboy magazine, Eric Norden, October 1967 
JFK Online: Jim Garrison audio resources - mp3s of Garrison speaking
The JFK 100: One Hundred Errors of Fact and Judgment in Oliver Stone's JFK: Who was Clay Shaw?

1913 births
1974 deaths
United States Army personnel of World War II
Businesspeople from New Orleans
Deaths from cancer in Louisiana
Deaths from lung cancer
People from Kentwood, Louisiana
Military personnel from Louisiana
People associated with the assassination of John F. Kennedy
United States Army officers